Adolpho Milman (26 July 1915 – 11 October 1980) was a Brazilian footballer who played as a forward. He made one appearance for the Brazil national team in 1942. He was also part of Brazil's squad for the 1942 South American Championship.

References

External links
 

1915 births
1980 deaths
Brazilian footballers
Association football forwards
Brazil international footballers
Fluminense FC players